Players and pairs who neither have high enough rankings nor receive wild cards may participate in a qualifying tournament held one week before the annual Wimbledon Tennis Championships.

Seeds

  Andreas Maurer (qualified)
  Marcos Hocevar (qualifying competition)
  Amos Mansdorf (qualifying competition)
  Ronald Agénor (qualifying competition)
  Claudio Mezzadri (second round)
  Roberto Saad (qualified)
  Simon Youl (second round)
  Ricardo Acuña (qualified)
  Christo van Rensburg (qualifying competition)
  Kelly Evernden (qualified)
  David Dowlen (qualifying competition)
  Matt Anger (qualified)
  Fernando Roese (first round)
  João Soares (first round)
  Robert Van't Hof (qualified)
  Broderick Dyke (first round)
  Glenn Michibata (qualifying competition)
  Andy Kohlberg (qualifying competition)
  Christo Steyn (qualified)
  Jeff Turpin (second round)
  Andy Andrews (first round)
  Darren Cahill (second round)
  Bruce Manson (first round)
  Eric Korita (first round)
  Marcel Freeman (qualifying competition)
  Craig A. Miller (qualified)
  Leonardo Lavalle (first round)
  Kevin Moir (qualifying competition)
  Leo Palin (second round)
  Robert Seguso (qualified)
  Juan Antonio Rodríguez (second round)
  José Clavet (second round)

Qualifiers

  Andreas Maurer
  Tony Giammalva
  Barry Moir
  Christo Steyn
  Gary Muller
  Roberto Saad
  Chris Dunk
  Ricardo Acuña
  Craig A. Miller
  Kelly Evernden
  Robert Seguso
  Matt Anger
  David Mustard
  Bud Cox
  Robert Van't Hof
  Thierry Champion

Qualifying draw

First qualifier

Second qualifier

Third qualifier

Fourth qualifier

Fifth qualifier

Sixth qualifier

Seventh qualifier

Eighth qualifier

Ninth qualifier

Tenth qualifier

Eleventh qualifier

Twelfth qualifier

Thirteenth qualifier

Fourteenth qualifier

Fifteenth qualifier

Sixteenth qualifier

External links

 1985 Wimbledon Championships – Men's draws and results at the International Tennis Federation

Men's Singles Qualifying
Wimbledon Championship by year – Men's singles qualifying